The 1909 Montana football team represented the University of Montana in the 1909 college football season. They were led by second-year head coach Roy White, and finished the season with a record of six wins, zero losses and one tie (6–0–1).

Schedule

References

Montana
Montana Grizzlies football seasons
College football undefeated seasons
Montana football